The three-toed skink can refer to several animals, all of the family Scincidae:

Algerian three-toed skink (Chalcides mertensi)
Italian three-toed skink (Chalcides chalcides)
Moroccan three-toed skink (Chalcides pseudostriatus)
Three-toed earless skink (Hemiergis decresiensis)
Three-toed snake-tooth skink (Coeranoscincus reticulatus)
Western three-toed skink (Chalcides striatus)
Yellow-bellied three-toed skink (the genus Saiphos)

Animal common name disambiguation pages